Oak Hammock Air Park Airport  is located adjacent to Oak Hammock Marsh in Manitoba, Canada.

References

Registered aerodromes in Manitoba